Sufism has played a major role in the history of Punjab. West Punjab is heavily influenced by Sufi Saints and major Sufi Pirs. The partition in 1947 led to the almost complete departure of Muslims from East Punjab. The Sufi shrines in the region continue to thrive, particularly among so-called ‘low’ caste Dalits that constitutes more than 30% of its population. After the partition the Dalit community took over the care of Sufi shrines in the East Punjab.

History
The majority of the Sufis from East Punjab come from the Chamar and Chuhra caste. Through the teachings of Guru Ravidass, some of the Dalits connect to the Qadri and Chishtia Sufi Orders. The holy Dalit Sufi Saints of Punjab are buried in graves that are painted in green and their tombs are covered with green cloth. Many proclaim themselves as disciples of Ghaus-ul-Azam, Khawaja Moinuddin Chishti, Baba Farid Shakarganj and other famous Sufis. However, many Sufi Pirs of Punjab do not connect themselves with mainstream Sufi orders.

The relationship between Dalits and Sufism in India, particularly in Punjab, is explored in the documentary Kitte Mil Ve Mahi, produced in 2005 by Ajay Bhardwaj.

The main Silsilas in Punjab include;

Qadri Noshahi
The Qadri Noshahi silsila (offshoot) was established by Syed Muhammad Naushah Ganj Bakhsh of Gujrat, Punjab, Pakistan, in the late sixteenth century.

Sarwari Qadiri

Also known as Qadiriya Sultaniya, the order was started by Sultan Bahu in the seventeenth century and spread in the western part of Indian subcontinent. It follows most of the Qadiriyya approach. In contrast, it does not follow a specific dress code or require seclusion or other lengthy exercises. Its mainstream philosophy is contemplation of belovedness towards God.

See also 

 Sufism in India

References

Punjab
Sufism in Pakistan